Music to See is a Canadian music educational television program which aired on CBC Television in 1957.

Premise
Helmut Blume presented this televised course on aspects of music such as electronic music, how opera is associated with drama and the conductor's role.

Awards and recognition
Ohio University presented Music to See with an award for educational broadcasting.

Scheduling
This half-hour series was broadcast Tuesdays at 10:30 p.m. (Eastern) from 3 September to 29 October 1957.

External links
 

CBC Television original programming
1950s Canadian music television series
1957 Canadian television series debuts
1957 Canadian television series endings
Black-and-white Canadian television shows